Huskvarna Södra IS was established in 1930 and is a sports club in Huskvarna, Sweden. The club won the Swedish women's table tennis team championship in 1970 and 1972. The association football team played their home games at Hjärttorpsvallen near Tenhultsvägen. In 1987 the men's association football team merged with Husqvarna IF, leading to the establishment of Husqvarna FF.

The early 1970s saw the dawn of the club scoring women's association football successes., leading to the team playing in the Swedish top division in 1978 and 1979.

References

External links
Huskvarna Södra IS table tennis section 

1930 establishments in Sweden
Defunct football clubs in Sweden
Sports clubs established in 1930
Table tennis clubs in Sweden
Sport in Huskvarna